Mark D. West (born July 26, 1968) is an American legal scholar, currently serving as the 17th dean of the University of Michigan Law School since January 2013.

He is widely published on the subject of Japanese law and the Japanese legal system, and is regarded as a leading American authority in these areas. From 2003 to 2008, West served as director of the University of Michigan Center for Japanese Studies. West's five-year tenure as director was the longest of any director since the center's founding in 1947. He has been the associate dean for academic affairs at Michigan Law since 2008.

Education
West received a bachelor of arts with a major in international studies from Rhodes College in 1989 and a juris doctor from Columbia Law School in 1993.

Early career 
When he was in the law school, he was notes and comments editor for the Columbia Law Review. He clerked for Eugene Nickerson of the United States District Court for the Eastern District of New York. West has been a Fulbright Research Scholar, an Abe Fellow, and a fellow of the Japan Society for the Promotion of Science.

Publications
West is the author or co-author of five books:

Economic Organizations and Corporate Governance in Japan: The Impact of Formal and Informal Rules. Curtis J. Milhaupt, co-author. Oxford: Oxford Univ. Press, 2004.
Law in Everyday Japan: Sex, Sumo, Suicide, and Statutes. Chicago: Univ. of Chicago Press, 2005. 
Secrets, Sex and Spectacle: The Rules of Scandal in Japan and the United States. Chicago: Univ. of Chicago Press, 2006. 
The Japanese Legal System: Cases, Codes, and Commentary. Curtis J. Milhaupt & J. Mark Ramseyer, co-authors. University Casebook Series. New York: Foundation Press, 2006.
Lovesick Japan: Sex, Marriage, Romance, Law. Ithaca: Cornell Univ. Press, 2011.

He has published articles in English and Japanese in the Journal of Japanese Studies, Hōritsu Jihō, American Journal of Comparative Law, Law and Society Review, Journal of Comparative Economics, University of Pennsylvania Law Review, University of Chicago Law Review, and Northwestern University Law Review among others. He is a frequent lecturer at universities in the United States and Japan, and an editor of the Journal of Japanese Law.

References

External links
 Faculty Biography from the University of Michigan Law School page
Publications
Mark D. West, Social Science Research Network profile

Living people
American legal scholars
Columbia Law School alumni
Deans of University of Michigan Law School
1968 births
Rhodes College alumni
Nippon Life
University of Michigan Law School faculty
Fulbright alumni